Izvorovo may refer to the following places in Bulgaria:

Izvorovo, Dobrich Province
Izvorovo, Haskovo Province
Izvorovo, Plovdiv Province
Izvorovo, Stara Zagora Province
Izvorovo, Targovishte Province